Adesmoides flava is a species of beetle in the family Cerambycidae, and the only species in the genus Adesmoides. It was described by Zajciw in 1967.

References

Hemilophini
Beetles described in 1967